The Astoria Stakes is a long-lived race for two-year-old Thoroughbred fillies run at Belmont Park in early June during the Belmont Stakes carnival.  Originally set at a distance of five furlongs, beginning in the year 1940, the event was increased to five and a half furlongs on the dirt.  The race currently offers a $150,000 purse.

This race began at Gravesend Race Track in 1902 where it stayed until 1910.  It then moved to Aqueduct Racetrack to be contested from 1914 to 1955, and again from 1960 to 1974. It was at Jamaica Race Course 1956, 1958, and 1959.

From 1985 through 1994 the Astoria Stakes held Grade III status.

Named after a neighborhood in the New York City borough of Queens, it would have been in its 103rd running in 2009, but due to the Financial crisis of 2007–2008, the Astoria was canceled by the NYRA as they adjusted races to meet the new Grade I standard purse of $300,000. The race was run again in 2014 as an overnight stakes.

Records
At 5½ furlongs : 1:02.80, Ruffian (1974) – North American record for a two-year-old.
At 5 furlongs : 0:58 flat,  Panoply (1919)

Most wins by a jockey:
 5 – Eddie Arcaro (1940, 1947, 1951, 1955, 1956)
 5 – Jorge Velásquez (1973, 1977, 1980, 1985, 1991)
 5 – Jerry Bailey (1979, 1992, 1994, 1996, 2004)
 5 – John Velasquez (2000, 2007, 2014, 2016, 2021)

Most wins by a trainer:
 5 – Todd Pletcher (1997, 2005, 2007, 2014, 2016)

Most wins by an owner:
 4  – Harry Payne Whitney (1919, 1920, 1924, 1926)
 4  – Cornelius Vanderbilt Whitney (1932, 1945, 1946, 1947)

Winners
NYRA – Belmont Park Astoria Stakes history:

 † In 1940, Key Ring dead-heated with Tangled for first but was disqualified.
 † Race run as the Astoria Purse, a non-stakes race.

References

External links
 Belmont Park  Belmont Park

1902 establishments in New York (state)
Horse races in New York (state)
Gravesend Race Track
Jamaica Race Course
Belmont Park
Flat horse races for two-year-old fillies
Previously graded stakes races in the United States
Recurring sporting events established in 1902